The National Association of Muslim Police (NAMP) is a British organisation for Muslim police officers. It represents more than 2,000 members and was founded in 2007.

1. The National Association of Muslim Police (NAMP) is a British organisation for Muslim police officers & staff.

2. To provide support to localised associations.

3. Improving recruitment, retention and progression of Muslim officers and staff.

4. Addressing disproportionality within misconduct and grievance procedures.

5. To promote an understanding and awareness of Islam within the police service and the wider community

6. To influence the direction of national policies within the Police Service.

7. To promote community cohesion and enhance the safety of our communities.

Current Chair:
Alex Gent 2020 - Current

Previous Chairs:
Mustafa Mohammed QPM 2016 – 2020

Islamophobia

The top priority for NAMP is to tackle Islamophobia both internally within the Police and externally within the community. A survey conducted by NAMP in 2020 showed that the one of the biggest barriers for Muslims applying for the Police is fear of institutional Racism and Islamophobia.

In October 2019, NAMP submitted a report to the Home Affairs Select Committee Islamophobia inquiry. The paper proposed that the following definition should be used to describe Islamophobia.

"Islamophobia encompasses a range of negative perceptions and attitudes towards Muslims. This may be expressed as a prejudice against and/or hatred towards Muslims. Islamophobia may take the form of rhetorical, physical or discriminatory behaviour and directed towards Muslim or non-Muslim individuals, the wider Muslim community and/or Muslim property."

In addition:
Islamophobia frequently links Muslims to terrorism, and it is often used to blame Muslims for issues within society. It is expressed in speech, writing, visual forms and action, and employs sinister stereotypes and negative character traits.
Contemporary examples of Islamophobia in public life, the media, schools, the workplace, and in the religious sphere could, taking into account the overall context, include, but are not limited to:

1. Calling for, aiding, or justifying the killing or harming of Muslims in the name of a radical ideology or an extremist view of religion

2. Calling for, aiding, or justifying damage or destruction of property such as Mosques and other religious establishments in the name of a radical ideology or an extremist view of religion

3. Making deceitful, dehumanising, demonising, or stereotypical allegations about Muslims such as, especially but not exclusively, the myth about all Muslims being terrorists

4. Accusing Muslims collectively of being responsible for real or imagined wrongdoing committed by a single Muslim person or group, or even for acts committed by non-Muslims

5. Accusing Muslims collectively of being supportive of terrorist organisations and other illegal practices such as FGM

6. Rhetoric which links Islam to terrorism and/or terrorist activity

7. Using the symbols and images associated with classic Islamophobia (e.g., illustrations of Muslims carrying bombs) to characterise Muslims

8. Holding Muslims collectively responsible for the actions of a government in a country where Muslims form the majority

9. Treating Muslims less favourably due to perceptions driven by negative stereotypes of the Muslim community

Criminal acts are Islamophobic when the targets of attacks, whether they are people or property (such as buildings, schools, places of worship and cemeteries) are selected because they are, or are perceived to be, Muslim or linked to Muslims.

Islamophobic discrimination is the denial of opportunities or services for Muslims, which are available to others.

Counter Terrorism (CT) Terminology

NAMP originally raised the issue about CT terminology in a paper submitted to the Home Affairs Select Committee in October 2019. This was followed by paper submitted to the Counter Terrorism Advisory Group, which proposed a change in terminology. Later that year in 2020 a survey was conducted by NAMP over members of the association and Muslims within the community. The survey highlighted that words such as "Islamism" and "Jihadism" link Islam itself to extremism, therefore stigmatising a whole religion and followers of it. The majority of respondents felt vulnerable when these terms are used. NAMP believes the use of such terminology creates negative perceptions of the general Muslim population, and contributes towards Islamophobic attitudes and an increase in hate crime. NAMP are seeking change this terminology and have made recommendations to the National Police Chief Council and the Independent Prevent Review.

NAMP Website: https://muslim.police.uk/
NAMP Twitter: @Official_NAMP

NAMP Knowledge Hub page: https://knowledgehub.group- National Association of Muslim Police User Group.

References

External links
 Official webpage

Muslim Police
Organizations established in 2007
2007 establishments in the United Kingdom
Islamic organisations based in the United Kingdom